The Indu-Brasil or Indo-Brazilian is a Brazilian breed of zebuine beef cattle. It was bred in the early twentieth century in the Triângulo Mineiro in the western part of Minas Gerais state, and particularly in the area surrounding Uberaba. It was originally known as the Induberaba. It derives from imported Indian zebuine cattle, principally Gir and Kankrej (which in Brazil are known as "Guzerá"). It was formerly an important beef breed, but in the twenty-first century is an endangered breed. It is characterised by particularly large ears, perhaps the largest seen in any breed of cattle.

History 

In 2017 a total population of 900 head was reported to the DAD-IS database of the Food and Agriculture Organization of the United Nations.

Characteristics 

Indo-Brazilian cattle have good heat and parasite resistance and thrive in the tropics. They are white to dark grey in colour with short horns and very large ears. They have the typical Zebu shoulder hump.

Use 

In Brazil, until the 1940s, this was the most used zebu race, but since the 1950s, Nelore cattle have become more popular. Today, about 90% of Brazilian cattle meat production comes from Nelore.

In the 1940s bulls of this breed were sold to American farmers and used in producing Brahman cattle.

References 

Cattle breeds originating in Brazil
Cattle breeds